Events from the year 1507 in England.

Incumbents
 Monarch – Henry VII
 Lord Chancellor – William Warham
 Lord Privy Seal – Richard Foxe
 Secretary of State – Thomas Ruthall

Events
21 December – Henry VII arranges a marriage between his younger daughter, Mary Tudor and Habsburg Archduke Charles.

Date unknown
 Thomas More leaves England to study on the Continent having made enemies amongst Henry VII's senior advisors.

Births
Ralph Sadler, statesman (died 1587)
 Thomas Gale, surgeon (died 1586)
 Nicholas Arnold, courtier (died 1580)
 Henry Radclyffe, 2nd Earl of Sussex, nobleman (died 1557)

Deaths
24 August – Cecily of York, princess (born 1469)
 27 August – Elizabeth Somerset, Baroness Herbert, heiress (born 1476)
 3 September – Thomas Savage, bishop and diplomat (born 1449)

References

 
Years of the 16th century in England